Naum Ilyich Idelson (Наум Ильич Идельсон in Russian) (March 1(13), 1885, Saint Petersburg - July 14, 1951, Leningrad) was a Soviet theoretical astronomer and expert in history of physics and mathematics.

The crater Idelson on the Moon is named after him.

References

Further reading

Russian astronomers
1885 births
1951 deaths
Scientists from Saint Petersburg